Bessie is a feminine given name, often a diminutive form (hypocorism) of Elizabeth, Beatrice and other names since the 16th century. It is sometimes a name in its own right. 

Notable people with the name include:

People 
Bessie Abott (1878-1919), American operatic soprano
Bessie Barriscale (1884–1965), stage name of American silent-film and stage actress Elizabeth Barry Scale
Elizabeth Blount (c. 1498 or c. 1500 or c.  1502–1539/1540), mistress of Henry VIII of England and mother of his son, Henry Fitzroy, 1st Duke of Richmond and Somerset
 Elizabeth Bessie Braddock (1899-1970), British politician, Member of Parliament (1945-1970)
 Elizabeth Bessie Christie (1904–1983), New Zealand artist
 Elizabeth Bessie Coleman (1892-1926), first African-American female aviator
Annie Elizabeth Delany (1891–1995), American dentist and civil rights pioneer
Bessie Alexander Ficklen (1861–1945), American poet, author, artist
Bessie Blount Griffin (1914-2009), American physical therapist, inventor, and forensic scientist
Bessie Head (1937-1986), Botswana writer
Bessilyn Johnson (1871-1943), wife of Chicago millionaire Albert Johnson
Bessie Love, stage name of American film actress Juanita Horton (1898-1986)
Bessie "Betty" Mitchell (1896–1976), Canadian theatre director and educator
Bessie Boehm Moore (1902–1995), American educator
 Bessie Moore (1854-1877), better known as Diamond Bessie, murdered prostitute
Bessie Rayner Parkes (1829-1925), English feminist, women's rights activist, poet, essayist and journalist
Bessie Smith (1894-1937), American blues singer
Bessie Stringfield (1911–1993), pioneer African-American motorcycle rider
Bessie Potter Vonnoh (1872–1955), American sculptor
 Bessie (South African queen)

Fictional characters 
 Bessie Higgenbottom, titular character of the Nickelodeon TV channel cartoon The Mighty B!
 Elizabeth Bessie Potter, on the TV series Dawson's Creek
 Bessie, the road paving machine in the 2006 Disney/Pixar animated film Cars
 Bessie Busybody, a character in the TV series LazyTown
 Bessie, affectionate name given to his yellow Austin car (registration number WHO1) by the Third Doctor (also used by Fourth, Seventh and Eleventh Doctors, Liz Shaw and Alice Obiefune) in the TV series Doctor Who

See also
 Bess (name)

English-language feminine given names
Hypocorisms